Cyamops banvaneue is a species of fly.

References

banvaneue
Insects described in 2000